Language is the human capacity for acquiring and using complex systems of communication, and a language is any specific example of such a system.

Language may also refer to:

Publications 
 Language (journal), a journal of the Linguistic Society of America
 Language (magazine), an avant garde poetry magazine (published 1978–1981)
 Language: An Introduction to the Study of Speech, a 1921 book by linguist Edward Sapir
 Language (Bloomfield book), a 1933 book by linguist Leonard Bloomfield
Language: Introductory Readings, an introductory linguistics textbook

Music 
 Language (Annie Crummer album), 1992
 Language (The Contortionist album), 2014
 Language (MNEK album), 2018
 "Language" (Dave Dobbyn song), 1994
 "Language" (Porter Robinson song), 2012
 "The Language" (song), a 2013 song by Drake
 "Language", a 1987 song by Suzanne Vega from Solitude Standing
 "Language", a 2019 song by Betty Who from Betty

Other uses 
Bad language, a subset of a language's lexicon considered impolite or offensive
Juan Language (born 1989), a South African rugby union player

See also 
 Artificial language, a language created for a specific purpose
 Formal language in mathematics or other fields, a set of strings of symbols that may be constrained by rules that are specific to it
 Programming language, a language created for the writing of computer programs
 Natural language, a language used naturally by humans for communication